Echography may refer to:
 Sonography or medical ultrasonography
 An echograph, more commonly called an ultrasound display

It:Ecografia